Mudhol Assembly seat is one of 224 assembly constituencies in Karnataka State, in India. It is part of Bagalkot (Lok Sabha constituency).

Members of Legislative Assembly 
Source

Also see
List of constituencies of the Karnataka Legislative Assembly

References

Assembly constituencies of Karnataka
Bagalkot district